The Turner's and Fox's Gaps Historic District comprises the Civil War-era battlefield involved in the Battle of South Mountain, which took place on September 14, 1862. The district extends on the west to the slopes of South Mountain in the area of Zittlestown, and to the east beyond the foot of the mountain to the small community of Bolivar. The district is characterized by steep mountain terrain in the west and open farmland in the east, with Turner's Gap to the north and Fox's Gap to the south. The district includes 115 contributing buildings and structures. The most significant contributing buildings are the Mountain House Inn (now the Old South Mountain Inn) and the White House Inn, or Beachley House. Also included in the list is the Reno Monument at Fox's Gap, shown at right. The Old National Pike, now known as U.S. 40 Alternate, passes over South Mountain at Turner's Gap.

The district was placed on the National Register of Historic Places on January 12, 2011.

See also
 Crampton's Gap Historic District comprises the southern extent of the Battle of South Mountain, also known as the Battle of Crampton's Gap.
 Dahlgren Chapel, at the summit of Turner's Gap, listed as a non-contributing building due to its post-Civil War construction
 Washington Monument State Park is located nearby, but not included in the district

References

External links

, including undated photo, at Maryland Historical Trust

Historic districts in Frederick County, Maryland
Tourist attractions in Frederick County, Maryland
Historic districts in Washington County, Maryland
Tourist attractions in Washington County, Maryland
Appalachian Trail
Historic American Buildings Survey in Maryland
Historic districts on the National Register of Historic Places in Maryland
National Register of Historic Places in Frederick County, Maryland